William Karlin (March 29, 1882 – December 1944) was an American politician and labor leader from New York.

Life
He was born in the Russian Empire, the son of Samuel Karlin and Rose Karlin. The family emigrated to the United States, and settled in New York City. He attended the public schools and was licensed as a pharmacist in 1901. He studied law at New York University School of Law from 1906 to 1908, was admitted to the bar, and practiced in New York City. On November 10, 1917, he married Ida Beck (died 1972).

He was a Socialist member of the New York State Assembly (New York Co., 4th D.) in 1918.

In 1920, he appeared as counsel for the five suspended Socialist members of the 143rd New York State Legislature during their trial for fitness to take their seats, which ended with their expulsion.

In 1922, Karlin ran in the 20th District for Congress, but was defeated by Republican Fiorello La Guardia.

Karlin ran unsuccessfully on the Socialist ticket for New York Attorney General at the state elections in 1928, 1930, 1932 and 1934.

In 1936, he left the Socialist Party and joined the Social Democratic Federation.

Sources
 NAME KARLIN FOR CONGRESS in NYT on August 11, 1922
 Who's Who in New York City and State (Vol. 10; 1938; pg. 599)
 WILLIAM KARLIN, 62, A LABOR ATTORNEY; Former Assemblyman, Once a Socialist Leader, Dies; Won Secondary Picketing Right in NYT on December 7, 1944 (subscription required)
 MRS. WILLIAM KARLIN in NYT on September 15, 1972 (subscription required)

1882 births
1944 deaths
American labor lawyers
New York (state) lawyers
Socialist Party of America politicians from New York (state)
Members of the New York State Assembly
Emigrants from the Russian Empire to the United States
20th-century American politicians
20th-century American lawyers
Pharmacists from New York City